Pussy torture (also known as vagina torture, cunt torture or female genitorture) is a BDSM or sexual activity involving the application of pain or pressure to a vulva or vagina, typically in the context of sadomasochism. It is sometimes considered to be an analogue of cock and ball torture. Pussy torture is meant to be done consensually in the case of BDSM. The recipient may take part in order to provide pleasure to a sadistic dominant. Another motivation is to receive masochistic pleasure from the activity. Mild examples of pussy torture sometimes occur in conventional sex, while the more extreme ones are usually kink practices.

Genital stimulation produces sexual arousal and can do so even if that stimulation is painful. The ability to endure and enjoy such pain varies a great deal between individuals. Stimulation that would produce mild sensation elsewhere in the body can be very intense if applied to the genitals, and for this reason some BDSM practitioners avoid pussy torture. Physiologically the practice provides changes in blood flow to the genitals and releases endorphins and hormones. Some techniques are very dangerous and unsafe and many carry significant health risks, and hence adequate precautions need to be taken. Information on safety issues is often obtained from experienced practitioners or from BDSM training workshops. The dominant performing pussy torture on the submissive can be of any gender.

Techniques
Pussy torture is applied through techniques such as:

Piercing

Piercing techniques are applied to the vulva, typically piercing the labia with needles or pins. Rows of needles through the labia minora can pin them to a board and stretch them apart to expose the vaginal opening. A row of needles through the labia majora can be used to hold them together. Rings or clasps can be fastened to the labia piercings and used to induce pain. Existing labia piercing rings can also be used for this. Piercing rings can be connected to cords to hold the labia apart or they can be sewn up or tied together for erotic torture purposes.

Impact play

Impact play is applied to the vulva. This includes techniques such as spanking or slapping (by hand or with a spanking paddle), whipping or caning. Spraying water at high pressure produces a similar effect. The sensations produced can be pleasurable as impact play on the vulva increases blood flow to the genitals and gives a stinging sensation. Pussy torture typically makes use of more intense or prolonged impact play.

Clamping

Genital clamps are used, either ones specifically sold for this use, repurposed nipple clamps, forceps or household clothespins. These are attached to the labia majora, clitoral hood or the base of the clitoris to restrict blood flow and are then released. The labia minora can be clamped though they are too thin for some types of clamp. The clitoris itself can be clamped using a clitoral clamp designed for the purpose or a light clip can be attached to it. The clitoris and labia swell upon arousal, which increases the intensity of the clamping. Clamps attached to the labia can be used to pull them apart to expose the vaginal opening. The clamps can be attached to straps or chains, a bondage rope harness or a suspender belt. If a submissive has nipple piercings then labia clamps can be tied to these. The effect of clamps can be intensified by using weighted clamps or weights attached to standard clamps. Predicament bondage scenarios can be played using genital weights or by attaching the clamps to bondage cuffs worn on the wrists or ankles.

Wax play

Hot wax is dripped onto the labia or clitoris. To make the process easier, pegs or clamps are sometimes used to hold the labia open, but wax is not dripped into the vagina. Wax that is designed for BDSM is commercially available, and it is safer than some other types of wax. This technique combines erotic torture with sensation play.

Crotch rope

A crotch rope is tied between the legs, using either a single tight line or a split line consisting of a pair of ropes running either side of the genitals. The former is designed to stimulate the genitals while the latter leaves them exposed for BDSM play. A tightly tied crotch rope can cause pain due to its pressure, while a looser one can stimulate the genitals with friction. A crotch rope is typically secured by being tied round the waist but it can be attached to the wrists, elbows, ankles or hair of the submissive. Alternatively the free end of the rope can be held by the dominant for use as a lead or leash or suspended from the ceiling. Vibrations can be transmitted to the genitals by attaching a vibrator to the crotch rope, and the clitoris can be stimulated by placing a knot at that point in the rope. Other bondage materials such as chains or leather can be used instead of rope.

A crotch rope is also used for rope riding. This makes use of a horizontal rope fastened to two fixed points or held taut so that it runs between the legs of a standing submissive. The higher the ends of the rope are, the greater will be the pressure on the vulva. Movement along the rope can be used for abrasion play.

Suction
Suction is applied to the labia using a pussy pump or to the clitoris using a clitoral pump. These pumps increase the blood supply to the areas involved, enlarging and sensitising them for BDSM play. A similar effect can be obtained using erotic cupping. This technique, in which cups, bowls or bells are used to create suction on the skin, is similar to the cupping therapy used in alternative medicine. The sensation can be erotic, and as with the use of pumps, the drawing of the blood to the genitals can make the area more sensitive once the equipment is removed. Erotic cupping can also cause pain and leave bruised marks on the skin.

Insertion

Insertion techniques can be applied to the vagina in order to stretch it. This can include the fingers or a hand, a technique known as fisting. Alternatively objects can be inserted into the vagina, such as a large dildo, a vibrator or a vaginal hook. This is a curved BDSM tool, typically metal, similar to an anal hook. The short end is inserted into the vagina and long end positioned along the midline of the body. There is usually a ring at the long end for attaching a rope.

Figging, the practice of inserting peeled ginger root into an orifice, is sometimes applied to the vagina. Peeled ginger root is also sometimes held against the clitoris or rubbed onto the vulva.

Erotic electrostimulation

Erotic electrostimulation is applied to the genitals using general electro-play sex toys such as the violet wand or ones specifically designed for the vulva.

Forced orgasms

Forced orgasms can be induced using a vibrator that has intense vibrations, typically a strong wand vibrator that is tied in place so that it continuously vibrates the clitoris. Alternatively orgasm denial can be practiced. Forced orgasms are sometimes produced using devices such as Yoni eggs or Ben Wa balls. Similar effects can be achieved by prolonged seating on a sybian, wearing a chastity belts that has a built-in dildo or vibrating or pulsating abilities, or using a sex machine..

Other techniques

The vaginal opening can be spread. This is often done manually by the dominant using his/her hands, but using a speculum for this purpose can provide erotic humiliation or be part of a medical fetish. 

The vulva and labia can be bitten, squeezed or pinched. A wartenberg wheel can be run across the vulva. Prolonged seating on a wooden horse can also be used.

See also

 Breast torture
 Chastity piercing
 Fear play
 Female genital mutilation
 Groin attack
 List of BDSM equipment

References

Further reading
 
 
 

BDSM activities
Paraphilias
Sexual acts
Vulva